Bareilly City railway station is a medium size railway station in Bareilly district, Uttar Pradesh. Its code is BC. It serves Bareilly city. The station consists of four platforms. The platform is well sheltered. It includes facilities including water and sanitation.

References

External links 

Izzatnagar railway division
Railway stations in Bareilly